A Hoosier cabinet (also known as a "Hoosier") is a type of cupboard or free-standing kitchen cabinet that also serves as a workstation. It was popular in the first few decades of the 20th century in the United States, since most houses did not have built-in kitchen cabinetry. The Hoosier Manufacturing Co. of New Castle, Indiana, was one of the earliest and largest manufacturers of this product, causing the term "Hoosier cabinet" to become a generic term for that type of furniture. By 1920, the Hoosier Manufacturing Company had sold two million cabinets.

Hoosier-style cabinets were also made by dozens of other companies, and most were in the Hoosier State or located nearby. Some of the larger manufacturers were Campbell-Smith-Ritchie (Boone); Coppes Brothers and Zook (the Napanee); McDougall Company; and G. I. Sellers and Sons. Hoosier cabinets evolved over the years to include more accessories and innovations that made life easier for cooks in the kitchen. They peaked in popularity in the 1920s, then declined as homes began to be constructed with built-in kitchen cabinets and counter tops. The Hoosier Manufacturing Company was sold in 1942 and liquidated. Today, Hoosier cabinets are valued by antique collectors.

Background

From 1890 to 1930, more houses were built in the United States than all of the country's prior years combined. Very few homes had built-in kitchen cabinets during the 19th century, and it was not until the late 1920s that built-in cabinets became a standard kitchen furnishing. Around the 1890s, several furniture manufacturers in Indiana discovered that a stand-alone kitchen cabinet with storage and a workspace (essentially a baker's cabinet with extra storage) was easy to sell. It was a kitchen workstation with ingredient and equipment storage where the cook could complete all food preparation and not move until it was time to cook the food. The Hoosier Manufacturing Company was one of those early manufacturers. In 1900, the company moved a short distance from Albany, Indiana to New Castle, Indiana. It began improving its manufacturing and distribution process, and was a strong believer in advertising. By 1906, it had 146 employees. The company's product was nationally promoted as a step saver, and its popularity led to the term Hoosier cabinet becoming a generic term for that style of kitchen cabinet—similar to the term kleenex (the facial tissue called Kleenex manufactured by Kimberly-Clark) becoming a generic term for facial tissues.

Hoosier cabinets were very popular from 1900 to 1930. Hoosier Manufacturing sold two million cabinets from its inception to 1920, and additional cabinets were sold by the company's competitors. Given that there were approximately 20 million households in the US at that time, as much as 10% of homes had Hoosier cabinets made by Hoosier Manufacturing, and an additional unknown quantity had Hoosier cabinets made by competing companies.

Hoosier cabinets remained popular until the 1920s. By then houses were being built with modern kitchens that included built-in cabinets, counter tops, and other fixtures. Thus, supplanted, the Hoosier cabinet largely disappeared. Some manufacturers diversified into built-in cabinets and kitchen furniture. The Great Depression made sales more difficult. By 1935, Hoosier cabinets were considered "old fashioned". The two largest manufacturers, Hoosier Manufacturing and G. I. Sellers and Sons, were closed in 1942 and 1950, respectively.

Features
A Hoosier cabinet is a stand-alone kitchen cabinet, often on small casters. It is considered an improved version of a baker's cabinet. A baker's cabinet is a table with one or more bins underneath. It has a small work surface and a shallower upper section on top of the table that was used for storing bowls, pans, and kitchen utensils. The Hoosier cabinet expands on the baker's cabinet by offering a pull-out workspace/shelf and storage for everything a cook would need. The base section usually has one large compartment with the slide-out shelf covered in metal that offers more workspace, and several drawers to one side. The top portion is shallower and has several smaller compartments with doors.

A distinctive feature of the Hoosier cabinet is its many moving parts and accessories. As originally supplied, they were equipped with various racks and other hardware to hold and organize spices and various staples. One particularly distinctive item is the combination flour-bin/sifter, a hopper that could be used without having to remove it from the cabinet. A similar sugar bin was also common. Additional accessories and innovations were added over the years. Special glass jars were manufactured to fit the cabinet and its racks. Original sets of Hoosier glassware consisted of coffee and tea canisters, a salt box, and four to eight spice jars. Some manufacturers also included a cracker jar. Colored glassware, ant-proof casters, and even ironing boards were innovations added later. Later models even included cards with reminders for grocery shopping and tips for meal planning.

Major manufacturers
Hoosier cabinets were made mostly from the late 1890s through the 1930s, reaching their peak in popularity during the 1920s. The major manufacturers of Hoosier cabinets at that time were located in Indiana. Hoosier Manufacturing was the largest.

Campbell-Smith-Ritchie Company
The company began as Campbell & Smith in 1892, and it was primarily a lumber yard and planing mill. Lebanon is the county seat of Boone County, Indiana, and Campbell-Smith-Ritchie named its Hoosier-style kitchen cabinets Boone Kitchen Cabinets in honor of the county. In 1905, the lumberyard was destroyed by fire. The company built a new facility on the edge of town. By 1910, its kitchen cabinet making business was doing so well that the lumberyard portion of the business was discontinued. An Indiana inspection report for 1913 described the company as engaged in manufacturing furniture and having 90 employees. It was also the largest employer inspected in Lebanon.

The company advertised nationally, and claimed its product was designed by women from all over the nation. Models of the Boone cabinets were differentiated with names such as the Mary Boone, Bertha Boone (a larger model with storage closets at each end), and Betty Boone (a small model for apartments or smaller homes). Some included a hidden ironing board. The company, like many companies, prospered until the Great Depression. Demand for Hoosier cabinets declined at the time, first because of the difficult economic times, but also because homes began to be built with built–in cabinetry in the kitchen. The company responded by cutting back on employee hours and diversifying into built-in kitchen cabinets and breakfast dining sets. This strategy enabled it to survive into 1940 when it was sold. The company continued for another 18 months, but was then liquidated.

Coppes Brothers and Zook
The Coppes Brothers and Zook decided to concentrate on kitchen cabinets in 1914. Their manufacturing facility was located in Nappanee, Indiana, and their Hoosier cabinet brand name was the Napanee Dutch Kitchenet (spelled with only one "p"). Using data from a study by a famous efficiency engineer (Harrington Emerson), the company claimed that their product could save 1,592 steps per day.

Earlier, the Coppes brothers had a sawmill business, a box manufacturing factory, and a furniture manufacturing company. An Indiana inspection report for 1913 described their company (named Coppes, Zook, and Mutschler Co. at that time) as a "saw mill, etc." and having 178 employees in a town with a population of 2,260. Right before the Great Depression started, the company began manufacturing built-in kitchen cabinets. This product was very successful, and continued for many years after the demise of the Hoosier cabinets. The Coppes Napanee company remains in business to this day and is the longest-continuously-operating cabinet manufacturer in the United States.

Hoosier Manufacturing Company
The Hoosier Manufacturing Co. began in Albany, Indiana in the year 1898. The founders were glassmaker James McQuinn, his son Emmett McQuinn, and two business partners from Muncie, Indiana—John M. Maring, and Thomas Hart. Maring and Hart served as the president and vice president, respectively. The two McQuinns ran the business, with the elder McQuinn as the plant's general manager. The younger McQuinn was the advertising manager.  Originally, the company used a former furniture manufacturing plant to make a seed separator used on farms. A secondary product, a stand-alone kitchen cabinet, sold better than the seed separator—and quickly became the company's main product. Each of the early Hoosier Cabinets was hand–made. The cabinet was similar to a baker's cabinet, with storage bins below a work space and a two-door upper section. However, the Hoosier Cabinet had "meticulously organized interior storage", which enabled it to serve as a kitchen workstation with all the necessary equipment and material within arm's reach.

The company's Albany facility was destroyed by a fire in 1900. A profile of the McQuinns from a 1902 publication discussed the New Castle facility, and said that the "output of the factory now amounts to nearly 200 complete kitchen cabinets per week, and sales are made of the article in every state in the Union, and many foreign countries."

In addition to its product, Hoosier Manufacturing's success can be attributed to its strengths in advertising, distribution, and manufacturing. Hoosier Manufacturing created its own dealer network, since some furniture dealers were not fond of a product that competed with their wares. In cases where they had no dealer, products were sold directly from the factory. The company was also a strong believer in advertising. Advertising was conducted in newspapers and national magazines such as Ladies' Home Journal and The Saturday Evening Post, where the reader was likely to be a woman. In 1903, the company began streamlining its manufacturing process by using interchangeable hardware, standardizing its products, and using an assembly line. The employee responsible for these innovations, Harry Hall, was also granted patents related to innovations for the cabinet and for a safety apparatus.

By 1913, Hoosier Manufacturing, listed as a furniture maker by Indiana factory inspectors, had 470 employees. In 1916, the company sold its one millionth Hoosier Cabinet and was clearly the leader in free-standing kitchen cabinets. By 1920, two million had been sold. During its peak years, the company produced nearly 700 cabinets per day, and was the largest manufacturer of kitchen cabinets in the United States.

Free–standing kitchen cabinets began declining in popularity by 1930, and Hoosier Manufacturing responded by making kitchen cabinets that were meant to be built-in to the home. 
The company also began manufacturing kitchen tables and breakfast sets. During World War II, supplies and man-power became scarce. The company was sold and liquidated in 1942.

McDougall
McDougall was one of the early manufacturers of a Hoosier cabinet. An advertisement from 1919 identified the McDougall as "the first kitchen cabinet". George McDougall began the McDougall Company in Indianapolis, Indiana, sometime after the Civil War. The company's products were pie safes and kitchen tables. In 1898, the company name was changed to G. P. McDougall and Son. George's son Charles traveled to learn more about the furniture business, and persuaded his father to equip their kitchen tables with flour bins—a product that eventually became known as baker's cabinets. Charles also traveled to Europe and the European influence can be seen on McDougall cabinets. In 1909, a disgruntled employee set the factory on fire, destroying the entire facility.

Charles McDougall, with several business partners, restarted the business in Frankfort, Indiana, in 1910. The company was named McDougall Company, and Hoosier cabinets were its product. The plant utilized the latest technology for furniture manufacturing. The McDougall Hoosier cabinet had a patented auto-front roll door that dropped down instead of rolling up. Its flour bin had a glass front to show the flour level in the bin. In 1913, the McDougall plant had 148 employees, making it the largest (based on employees) factory in Frankfort.

Near the end of the 1920s, the McDougall front door was changed to be similar to those used by other Hoosier cabinets. Its flour bins were made smaller. The Great Depression was difficult. The company was reorganized in 1931. The company lasted a few years before closing.

Sellers
The G. I. Sellers Company was founded in Kokomo, Indiana, in 1888. The company made chifforobes, cabinets, and tables—and oak was their choice material. They grew to become the second largest manufacturer of Hoosier cabinets. By 1905, their manufacturing complex covered five city blocks. During that year, their plant was destroyed by fire. In order to restart their business as soon as possible, the company purchased a furniture factory in Elwood, Indiana. At that time, the company name was changed to the G. I. Sellers and Sons Company, and manufacturing was focused on Hoosier cabinets and tables.

By 1913, the Sellers plant employed 99 people, making it the second largest factory (based on employees) in Elwood. Among features Sellers promoted were an automatic lowering flour bin, glass drawer pulls, hand-rubbed finish on oak, and ant-proof casters. The company initiated a "Votes for Women" contest for little girls in 1914. Prizes were Junior Special Kitcheneed Cabinets, which were two–thirds the size of the Sellers Kitcheneed Special.

In 1922, Wilfred Sellers (company president) noted that the company typically produced 75,000 to 85,000 cabinets per year. Sellers introduced its Kitchenaire models in 1927, which had smaller flour bins but more drawers. In the early 1930s, coloring was featured, and new products were sold such as built-in kitchen cabinets and breakfast sets. During World War II, the company had difficulty acquiring raw materials and employing skilled workers. It ceased operations in 1950.

Other manufacturers
Between 1899 and 1949, over 40 manufacturers of stand-alone kitchen cabinets are known to have existed, and 18 of them were located in Indiana. Many of these manufacturers had much smaller advertising budgets compared to the major manufacturers, and it can be difficult to find information about them. Factory inspectors for the state of Indiana list at least eight companies, in addition to the major manufacturers, as kitchen cabinet makers in Indiana in 1913. Those companies are Cardinal Cabinet Company (Wabash), Greencastle Cabinet Company (Greencastle), Paul Manufacturing Company (Fort Wayne), Roach-Brown Manufacturing (Indianapolis), C. F. Schmoe Furniture Company (Shelbyville), Showers Brothers (Bloomington), Spiegle Cabinet Company (Shelbyville), and Wasmuch, Endicott Company (Andrews). Hoosier cabinets could also be mail-ordered from Montgomery Ward and Sears, Roebuck and Company.

 Ariel Cabinet Company of Peru, Indiana, which made the Ariel Handy Helper kitchen cabinet, was incorporated in 1920. The incorporators were from Goshen, Indiana, and already owned the Ariel Table Company of Auburn, Indiana. The Peru plant was used exclusively for kitchen cabinets, while the Auburn plant was used exclusively for kitchen tables.
 Baines-Mosier Cabinet Company of Allegan, Michigan, was established in 1906, and had 24 employees in 1915.
 Buchanan Cabinet Company of Buchanan, Michigan, manufactured kitchen cabinets and desks. It was founded in 1892, and had 31 employees in 1915.
 Cardinal Cabinet Company advertised its product as "Mother Hubbard's New Cupboards" The company began around 1910, and its officers were from Marion, Indiana. Company president in 1914 was G. A. Osborn. The Wabash, Indiana, company had 34 employees in 1913.
 Dearborn Desk Manufacturing Company of Marion, Indiana, made Marion Kitchen Cabinets. The flour bin was all-metal and removable, and it also had a sugar bin and metal bread and cake box. Indiana factory inspectors listed the company as a manufacturer of office desks with 20 employees in 1913. 
 Faultless Iron Works of St. Charles, Illinois, made the White House All Metal Kitchen Cabinet. The product was made of white enameled metal, and promoted for its beauty as well as its usefulness.
 Greencastle Cabinet Company of Greencastle, Indiana, employed 82 adults in 1913. The company introduced an adjustable height cabinet in 1914. The concept was said to have originated from a suggestion by a member of the local women's club.
 Hartman Furniture and Carpet Company of Chicago sold Hartman's Famous Indiana-made kitchen cabinet that was made in a factory in central Indiana.
 Hastings Cabinet Company of Hastings, Michigan, advertised “A Shorter Days Work” for its Hastings Cabinet. The 1911 version was made of oak and had metal bins. Its fixtures were made from glass and aluminum. The company was founded in 1906, and had 33 employees in 1915.
 Kalamazoo Stove Company made the Kalamazoo Kitchen Kabinet in Kalamazoo, Michigan. The product was all-metal and white-enameled. The company was listed as a stove manufacturer in 1915 by inspectors from the Michigan Department of Labor. It had 205 employees, and was founded in 1901.
 Landau Cabinet Company of St. Louis, Missouri, was organized in 1906. Its plant occupied an entire city block. The Landau cabinet had a patented drop flour bin and called its work top "Landau's porcelain metal top".
 Marsh Furniture Company of High Point, North Carolina made Hoosier cabinets among other types of furniture, and still exists today (2018)
 Minneapolis Furniture Company of Minneapolis, Minnesota, manufactured Elwell Kitchen Cabinets and also made medicine and bath cabinets
 National Fly Screen and Manufacturing Co. of Cincinnati made the National Sanitary Kitchen Cabinet and conducted made-to-order screen work.
 Ohio State Stove and Manufacturing Company made Royal Ossco all-steel kitchen cabinets in Columbus, Ohio.
 C. F. Schmoe Furniture Company advertised its Hoosier cabinets as "Diamond Kitchen Cabinets". The company had 82 employees in 1913. The Shelbyville plant, which became the fifth largest kitchen cabinet factory, was sold in 1919 to L.A. Young Industries who planned to use it for manufacturing farm implements.
 Showers Brothers, established in 1868, had three factories in Bloomington, Indiana, and one in Iowa. They built many types of furniture, including Hoosier cabinets. In 1913, they had 499 employees.
 Spiegel Cabinet Company began in 1925 as an expansion company of the Spiegel Furniture Company, and manufactured kitchen cabinets. It closed in 1950.
 Vincennes Furniture Manufacturing Company used Ideal as the trade name for its products. This company was established in Vincennes, Indiana, in 1902. It built tables, kitchen cabinets, cupboards, dressers, and bookcases. It had 75 employees in 1913.
 Wasmuch-Endicott Company touted "the smooth surface round corner" kitchen cabinet in their Kitchen Maid brand Hoosier cabinets. Their motto was "Let the Kitchen Maid be Your Kitchen Aid". Features included round corners, crystal glass, automatic sugar bin, bread box, and sifter flour bin.
 Wilson kitchen cabinets were sold by Sears.

Today

Hoosier cabinets can be found on display in museums such as the Henry Ford Museum, the Children's Museum of Indianapolis, and the Kentucky Museum. However, Hoosier cabinets are found in other places too. Numerous antique dealers and restoration companies are involved with Hoosiers because nostalgic homeowners want this piece of furniture in their home. People are also interested in reproductions of the Hoosier cabinet.

One author credits the work of Philip and Phyllis Kennedy for boosting the popularity of Hoosier cabinets. The Kennedys researched the cabinet's history and procedures for restoration during the 1980s. In a 1999 book, another author discussing the Hoosier cabinet mentioned that some cooks are "scouring antique stores, farm auctions, and flea markets for this unique, and still useful, piece of Americana."

Restored Hoosier cabinets are often sought after for use in early-twentieth-century-style kitchens, in homes from that era or in new homes built in the styles of that era." In 2004, Hoosier cabinets sold at auction were often priced at over $1,000 (equivalent to $ in ). Oak versions with all of the accessories (flour bin, sugar bin, glass spice jars, etc.) have sold for over $2,000 (equivalent to $ in ). Cabinets without the original accessories are typically lower priced. Some of the accessories, such as the flour sifters and the spice jars made by Sneath Glass also sell quickly. As always, beware of counterfeits and Hoosier Manufacturing nameplates added to old cabinets.

"Hoosier cabinets live on as more than inspiration for new varieties of kitchen furniture. A hundred years after their rise to prominence, restored originals and recent reproductions have become cherished objects in many a home." "The cabinets' sheer eccentricity, combined with their attractiveness as historic artifacts, has earned them a following equal to that of any group of collectors."

See also 
 Hutch (furniture)
 Kitchen cabinet
 Welsh dresser
 Secretary desk

Notes

Footnotes

Citations

References

External links

 YouTube video - Hoosier Cabinet, a historical perspective
 YouTube video - Antique Sellers Hoosier Kitchen Cabinet
 YouTube video - Hoosier Cabinet Tour
 Hoosier Cabinet Museum at Coppes Commons
 Hoosier Cabinets - Indiana Public Media

Cabinets (furniture)
Kitchen
Food storage
Furniture